is a passenger railway station located in the city of Narashino, Chiba Prefecture Japan, operated by the private railway company, Keisei Electric Railway.

Lines
Mimomi Station is served by the Keisei Main Line, and is located 34.0 km from the official starting point of the line at Keisei-Ueno Station.

Station layout

Mimomi Station has two opposed side platforms connected by a footbridge to the elevated station building.

Platforms

History
Mimomi Station was opened on 9 December 1926.

Station numbering was introduced to all Keisei Line stations on 17 July 2010. Mimomi Station was assigned station number KS28.

Passenger statistics
In fiscal 2019, the station was used by an average of 24,299 passengers daily (boarding passengers only).

Surrounding area
 Narashino Municipal Narashino High School
 Toho Junior and Senior High School 
 Narashino City Fourth Junior High School
 Narashino City Second Junior High School
 Narashino City Mimomi Elementary School
 Narashino City Higashinarashino Elementary School

See also
 List of railway stations in Japan

References

External links

 Keisei Station layout  

Railway stations in Japan opened in 1926
Railway stations in Chiba Prefecture
Keisei Main Line
Narashino